Philippe Raschke (born 19 September 1967, in Clermont-Ferrand) is a French former professional football defender. While at Strasbourg he won the 1995 UEFA Intertoto Cup and the Coupe de la Ligue in 1997. While at Sochaux he played as they won the 2004 Coupe de la Ligue Final.

References

External links

1967 births
Living people
French people of German descent
Sportspeople from Clermont-Ferrand
Association football defenders
French footballers
AS Monaco FC players
FC Girondins de Bordeaux players
AS Cannes players
RC Strasbourg Alsace players
FC Sochaux-Montbéliard players
Ligue 1 players
Ligue 2 players
Footballers from Auvergne-Rhône-Alpes